No Mercy, No Future ("The Touched") is a 1981 West German drama film directed by Helma Sanders-Brahms.

Plot
Veronika Christoph, the troubled daughter of uncaring bourgeois parents, has been institutionalized due to her schizophrenia. Without proper psychiatric treatment for her unearthly visions, she prowls the streets along the Berlin Wall at night in search of God, yet settles for the company of strange, exiled men.

Cast
Elisabeth Stepanek as Veronika Christoph
Jorge Reis as Demba
Curt Curtini as Magician
Hasan Hasan as Monsef
Carola Regnier as Physician
Hubertus von Weyrauch	as Veronika's Father
Irmgard Mellinger as Veronika's Mother
Nguyen Chi Danh as Patient
Erich Koltschack as Old Man
George Stamkoski as Greek Man
Karl Heinz Reimann as God's Son
Abdel Wahed Askar as Ibrahim
Nabil Reiroumi as Salem
Harald Hoedt as Patient
Erika Dannhoff as Countess
Günther Ehlert as Death

Release
The film was released on DVD by Facets Multi-Media in 2008.

Reception
Thomas Elsaesser, author of European Cinema: Face to Face with Hollywood, wrote that No Mercy, No Future was a "relative" failure in the commercial and critical aspects compared to Germany, Pale Mother and that the situation "may have led Sanders-Brahms in the direction of the European art cinema." London's Time Out has referred to the film's performances as faultless and it was screened at the 1982 Berlin International Film Festival and won the British Film Institute's Sutherland Trophy Award for 1981. Critic Michael Atkinson praised the film as a "classic, show-it-all acting coup that doesn’t wriggle free of your memory very easily."

References

External links

No Mercy, No Future at the TCM Movie Database
Die Berührte at Film Portal 

1980s avant-garde and experimental films
1981 drama films
1981 films
Fictional portrayals of schizophrenia
Films about religion
Films directed by Helma Sanders-Brahms
Films set in Berlin
Films set in psychiatric hospitals
German avant-garde and experimental films
German drama films
1980s German-language films
West German films
1980s German films